Cola nigerica is a species of flowering plant in the family Malvaceae. It is found in Cameroon and Nigeria. Its natural habitat is subtropical or tropical dry forests. It is threatened by habitat loss.

References

nigerica
Flora of Cameroon
Flora of Nigeria
Critically endangered flora of Africa
Taxonomy articles created by Polbot
Taxa named by Ronald William John Keay